Satya Akkala is an Indian actor and comedian who works in Telugu films. He won the SIIMA Award for Best Comedian – Telugu for Chalo (2018).

Career
Satya hails from Amalapuram, Andhra Pradesh. He discontinued his B. Tech degree from BVC Institute of Technology and Sciences, and ventured to pursue a career in films. Initially, he started as an assistant director and worked for films such as Drona (2009) and TV series Amrutham. He played the role of Pulakesi in the film Pilla Zamindar (2011). Director Sudheer Varma who liked mannerisms in the film, cast him in a key role in Swamy Ra Ra (2013). The film earned him recognition. Satya was also featured in the comedy show Jabardasth.

In 2019, Satya played one of the leads in comedy thriller film Mathu Vadalara (2019). One critic from The Hindu noted, "Sathya gets some of the best lines" while another critic from The Times of India stated that "Yesu is well-written and Satya outperformed it with ease. He proved how hilarious he can be with a well-crafted character". In 2021, he starred as a lead actor in the film Vivaha Bhojanambu.

Filmography

Actor

Voice actor

References

External links

Telugu comedians
Telugu male actors
Indian male film actors
Male actors in Telugu cinema
Living people
Year of birth missing (living people)
People from East Godavari district
Male actors from Andhra Pradesh
21st-century Indian male actors